The Humber Bridge (Debts) Act 1996 is an Act of the Parliament of the United Kingdom. The purpose of the Act was to give power to the Secretary of State for Transport to write off debts payable to the British Government by the Humber Bridge Board, operators of the Humber Bridge. The Act was necessary as the Board had accumulated debts of  £439 million by 1997. The Act allowed the Secretary of State to reorganise the Board's debts, and write off sufficient amount of debt to allow the Board to continue to maintain the Humber Bridge, a vital transport link for Humberside. This reduced the amount of debt to £333 million soon afterwards and resulted in calls for all tolls across the bridge to be abolished.

References

1996 in England
Acts of the Parliament of the United Kingdom concerning England
Humberside
United Kingdom Acts of Parliament 1996